Diffusivity is a rate of diffusion, a measure of the rate at which particles or heat or fluids can spread.

It is measured differently for different mediums.

Diffusivity may refer to:
Thermal diffusivity, diffusivity of heat
Diffusivity of mass:
 Mass diffusivity, molecular diffusivity (often called "diffusion coefficient")
 Eddy diffusion, eddy diffusivity
Kinematic viscosity, characterising momentum diffusivity
Magnetic diffusivity

Dimensions and units

Diffusivity has dimensions of length2 / time, or m2/s in SI units and cm2/s in CGS units.

References

Former disambiguation pages converted to set index articles